Glodzhevo (also transliterated Glojevo or Glodjevo) is a town in northeastern Bulgaria, part of Vetovo Municipality, Rousse Province.

Towns in Bulgaria
Populated places in Ruse Province